Pine bolete is a common name for several mushrooms and may refer to:

 Suillus bellinii
 Boletus pinophilus